Eckblad is a Norwegian surname. Notable people with the surname include:

 Edel Eckblad (1914–1994), Norwegian actress
 Finn-Egil Eckblad (1923–2000),  Norwegian mycologist, brother of Edel

See also
 Ekblad

Norwegian-language surnames